Vitex kuylenii is a species of plant in the family Lamiaceae. It is found in Belize, Guatemala, Honduras, Mexico, and Nicaragua.

References

kuylenii
Endangered plants
Taxonomy articles created by Polbot